Joe Haines is the name of:

 Joe Haines (journalist) (born 1928), British journalist and former press secretary to Labour leader and Prime Minister Harold Wilson 
 Joe Haines (politician) (1923–2015), former member of the Ohio House of Representatives
 Joe Haines (speedway rider) (born 1991), speedway rider for the Rye House Rockets

See also
 Joseph Haines (died 1701), actor and performer 

Joseph Haynes (disambiguation)